Kiçik Pireli (also, Kiçik Pirelli, Kichik Pirali, and Kichik-Pirelli) is a village and municipality in the Qabala Rayon of Azerbaijan.  It has a population of 703.

References 

Populated places in Qabala District